Aeneas Shaw ( – February 6, 1814) was a Scottish soldier and political figure in Upper Canada. Shaw was born in Pitlochry, Scotland  and came to Staten Island, New York around 1770. He enlisted in the Queen's Rangers at the start of the American War of Independence, later rising to the rank of captain. After the siege of Yorktown, he settled in the Nashwaak River area of New Brunswick. He rejoined the re-formed Queen's Rangers and moved to Kingston in Upper Canada in 1792. When he was appointed to the Executive Council and Legislative Council of Upper Canada in 1794, he moved to Niagara. 

In 1793, he helped prepare the site for the new capital at York. In 1796, he was appointed lieutenant for York County. In 1811, as tensions increased between Britain and the United States, Shaw became a major general in the Canadian Militia, being responsible for training new recruits. However, colonial legislation only required militia recruits to train for three days a month. Shaw's troops did not perform well during the battle of York during the War of 1812. He died at York in 1814. Shaw's daughter, Sophia, is said to have been engaged to Major-General Sir Isaac Brock, who died at the Battle of Queenston Heights in 1812.

References
Biography at the Dictionary of Canadian Biography Online

1740 births
1814 deaths
Members of the Legislative Council of Upper Canada
Military personnel from Inverness
United Empire Loyalists
British people of the War of 1812
People from Niagara-on-the-Lake